Kika Mirylees (born Christina Kika Le Fleming Mirylees; 23 September 1953) is a South African-born British actress and councillor. She is best known for her roles as Julie Johnston in Bad Girls, Doc Newton in Red Dwarf and Hazel Hobbs in EastEnders.

Career
Mirylees  played Angela Snow in The Darling Buds of May, Flora McInnes in Strathblair, and Doc Newton in Red Dwarf. Her guest roles include Zola Zbzewski in Jonathan Creek, Sylvana Watson in Taggart, Maria Huntly in The Bill, and Barbara Wells in Casualty. In the 1980s she played Carinna in Lovejoy. Mirylees is also known for her role as Julie Johnston in Bad Girls. She played the role from the first episode, in 1999, to the final episode, in December 2006. On 5 January 2007, it was announced on GMTV that Mirylees had joined EastEnders as Hazel Hobbs, the mother of Garry. She made her first appearance in the soap on 10 April 2007 and her last on 24 April 2008. In late 2007, she appeared in an episode of the sitcom Not Going Out as a snobby character called Fliss.

Mirylees starred in Holby City in 2009. She also worked for Tristan Versluis' directorial debut,  Not Alone. In March 2020, she appeared in an episode of the BBC soap opera Doctors as Isa Auld.

Personal life
Mirylees lives in Farnham, Surrey. She is a councillor for Waverley Borough Council.

Filmography

References

External links

Living people
English soap opera actresses
People from Surrey
Year of birth missing (living people)
1950s births
South African television actresses